Princess Olga Andreevna Romanoff (born 8 April 1950) is a Russian princess and descendant of the House of Romanov. She is the president of the Romanov Family Association.

Biography

Princess Olga is the youngest child of Prince Andrei Alexandrovich of Russia and the only one born of his second marriage in 1942, to Nadine Sylvia Ada McDougall (1908–2000), daughter of Lt. Col. Herbert McDougall. Her father was the son of Grand Duke Alexander Mikhailovich of Russia, who belonged to a cadet branch of the Romanovs, and his wife Grand Duchess Xenia Alexandrovna, Tsar Nicholas II's sister. Olga Andreevna uses the English version of her family name, preferring 'Romanoff' to 'Romanova', the feminine form of her name in Russian. She is known by the title "Princess Olga Andreevna Romanoff".

Educated in her mother's stately home Provender, Faversham, Kent, England by private tutors, she was told of her family's tragic imperial heritage in pre-revolutionary Russia as a child by her exiled father. She joined the Romanov Family Association (RFA) in 1980 and, with other members, attended the long-delayed interment of Russia's last emperor and empress in St. Petersburg in 1998. On 3 December 2017, nearly a year after the death of Prince Dimitri Romanovich Romanov on the last day of 2016, she was elected president of the RFA. In the interim, the senior male Romanov descendant by primogeniture, Prince Andrew Andreyevich Romanov (born 1923), was chosen Honorary RFA president. Olga intended to return for the centenary memorial in 2018, at which however, Paul Kulikovsky, a great-grandson of Grand Duchess Olga Alexandrovna, and a contingent of other Romanov descendants represented the RFA.

She lives at Provender House in the hamlet of Provender, near Faversham in Kent, where she has restored the 13th century mansion and opened it to tourists. Having inherited the ageing mansion and  estate in 2000, she raised the money to have it refurbished by selling what was left of her father's cache of pre-revolutionary artefacts, most of which had long since been sold to the British royal family.

In 2005, she was on Australian Princess (a reality show) giving advice to competitors. During an interview on Channel 4 television's "Royal House of Windsor", she corrected the prevalent view that the fatal abandonment by the British of Tsar Nicholas II, his wife and children to the Bolsheviks during the Russian revolution was not due to the callousness of the British government of the day, but to the reluctance of his diffident cousin King George V, as was revealed by Kenneth Rose in his biography of the King.

In 2017 she published a memoir, Princess Olga, A Wild and Barefoot Romanov.

She serves alongside Princess Katarina of Yugoslavia as a royal patron of the Queen Charlotte's Ball.

Marriage and children
Once considered a possible bride for her third cousin King Charles III, she married Thomas Mathew (born 8 July 1945, son of Francis Mathew former manager of The Times), in nuptials at the Orthodox Cathedral of the Assumption and at the Brompton Oratory on 1 October 1975. A member of the Irish gentry, he also had homes in England at South Kensington and in the vicinity of Hatchlands Park in Surrey. They separated in 1989, having had issue:
 Nicholas Mathew (b. 6 December 1976); married Judith Aird Stanley (b. 1 October 1976), three children : Thomas (b. 2004) Lucy (b. 2006) Isabella Florence (b. 2011).
 Francis-Alexander Mathew (b. 20 September 1979); freelance photographer. 2012 contestant on Ukraine version of The Bachelor. Starred in season 2 of Secret Princes as "Prince Alexander".
 Alexandra Mathew (b. 20 April 1981)
 Thomas Mathew (27 November 1987 – 20 April 1989)

Ancestry

Notes

References

External links
 
 Ancestral landscape

House of Romanov in exile
1950 births
Living people
People from London
Russian princesses
English people of Russian descent